Markus Kreuz (born 29 April 1977) is a German former professional footballer who played as a midfielder.

Career
Kreuz played professionally for 1. FSV Mainz 05, 1. FC Kaiserslautern, Hannover 96, 1. FC Köln, Eintracht Frankfurt, FC Rot-Weiss Erfurt, Real Murcia, Kickers Offenbach and FSV Frankfurt, and WAC St. Andrä.

Personal life
In 2015, Kreuz returned to youth club VfL Frei-Weinheim as a playing assistant manager.

References

External links
 
 

1977 births
Living people
Association football midfielders
German footballers
Germany under-21 international footballers
Germany B international footballers
1. FSV Mainz 05 players
Hannover 96 players
1. FC Köln players
Eintracht Frankfurt players
FC Rot-Weiß Erfurt players
Real Murcia players
Kickers Offenbach players
FSV Frankfurt players
Bundesliga players
2. Bundesliga players
Segunda División players
German expatriate footballers
German expatriate sportspeople in Spain
Expatriate footballers in Spain
German expatriate sportspeople in Austria
Expatriate footballers in Austria